Kothavadi  is a village in Kinathukadavu Taluk, Coimbatore district in the Indian state of Tamil Nadu. Kothavadi is the birthplace of Indian space scientist Mylswamy Annadurai.

Transport
Direct Bus from Coimbatore33C To Kothavadi
Direct Bus from Pollachi46 To [Kothavadi]
Buses from Kinathukadavu 46,K3 To Kothavadi Available
Buses from negamam To Kinathukadavu Available.

References

Villages in Coimbatore district